The Thiriotiidae are a family of parasitic alveolates in the phylum Apicomplexa.

Taxonomy

There is one genus in this family - Thiriotia.

The type species is Thiriotia pisae.

Other species in this genus include Thiriotia pugettiae.

History

This genus was created by Desportes, Vivarès and Théodoridès in 1977.

Description

References

Apicomplexa families